Youngstown–Warren Regional Airport  is a public and military airport in Vienna Township, Trumbull County, Ohio, 11 miles north of Youngstown and  east of Warren. The airport is home to the Youngstown–Warren Air Reserve Station.

The airport has been open for over 50 years. It is run by the Western Reserve Port Authority, made up of members appointed by the Mahoning and Trumbull County Commissioners. The WRPA plays a vital role in the regional economy as it teams with the Youngstown–Warren Regional Chamber of Commerce and is leading the plan to clean up the Mahoning River.

History
The Youngstown–Warren Regional Airport began as the Youngstown Municipal Airport (MAP), and was one of the last Works Progress Administration projects. Construction began in 1939, and the airport opened a year later. The airport that had been serving the city, Lansdowne Airport, lacked room to expand.

In 1981, a 225,000-ft2 production facility for the Commuter Aircraft Corporation was built on the west side of the airport, but the company closed down before any aircraft were built.

Capital Airlines, US Airways, United Airlines, Continental Airlines, Northwest Airlines, Pan Am Clipper Connection, and Vacation Express had served the airport at some point. In the early 2000s, the airport had no scheduled airline service, following Northwest’s discontinuance of service to Detroit in 2002. In 2006, Allegiant Air began scheduled service to Orlando, Florida, twice weekly, bringing commercial air service back to Youngstown. That service expanded in 2014 with 12 to 18 flights per week to Punta Gorda and St Petersburg/Clearwater, Florida, and Myrtle Beach, South Carolina. Since 2015, service has declined drastically with the addition of Allegiant service in Pittsburgh, Akron, and now Cleveland. Allegiant started flying just two to four times a week during the fall and winter, and six times a week in the summer. In 2008, Vision Airlines announced the start of charter operations to and from Gulfport, Mississippi, once a month. This service has also since ended.

On November 30, 2015, the USDOT gave tentative approval for Aerodynamics, Inc. to begin daily service between Youngstown-Warren and Chicago O'Hare International Airport in the spring of 2016, but this flight service was permanently grounded on August 24, 2016, after just six weeks.

In January 2018, Allegiant Air ceased all scheduled flight operations to Youngstown. The airport has been without commercial aviation service since that time, and lost its "primary airport" status with the FAA as a result.

Other nearby airports include Cleveland Hopkins International Airport, Akron–Canton Airport, Erie International Airport, and  Pittsburgh International Airport.

Youngstown Air Reserve Station

Youngstown ARS is located at the Youngstown–Warren Regional Airport. Its primary mission is to serve as home of the 910th Airlift Wing (910 AW), an Air Force Reserve Command (AFRC) C-130H unit with two flying squadrons and a total of 16 aircraft. The 910 AW is operationally gained by the Air Mobility Command  and a portion of the wing is devoted to its aerial spray mission. The 910 AW has nearly 1,450 personnel, consisting of a combination of full-time active guard and reserve, air reserve technicians, and traditional part-time drilling Air Force reservists. The installation also hosts a Navy Operational Support Center and a Marine Corps Reserve Center that is home to nearly 400 Navy and Marine Corps reservists in various units.  It is also home to the Youngstown ARS Composite Squadron of the Ohio Wing of the Civil Air Patrol.

Facilities and aircraft
It has three asphalt runways: 5/23 is 5,002 by 150 feet (1,525 x 46 m); 14/32 is 9,003 by 150 feet (2,744 x 46 m); 143/323 is 3,500 by 60 feet (1,067 x 18 m).

In 2008 the airport had 60,845 aircraft operations, average 166 per day: 59% general aviation, 38% military, 3% air taxi and  less than 1% scheduled commercial. 43 aircraft were then based at this airport: 47% single-engine, 19% multi-engine, 7% jet and 28% military.

The former long-term parking lot is being used as a training location for a semi truck driving school.

Passenger terminal
The Youngstown Warren Regional Airport terminal building sits on the southeast end of the airport. In 2000, the Youngstown Airport renovated and expanded the boarding area. The new gate area consists of six gates (two jetways and four ground-loading gates), and accommodates aircraft ranging up to a Boeing 757 in size. The airport is equipped to handle up to 250,000 passengers a year in the current configuration and can seat up to 400 passengers at any given time. Currently the airport has four ticket counters, one baggage claim and on-site capacity for up to five rental car companies. The airport's only on-site restaurant was Mikees II, which closed shortly after Allegiant Airlines ceased all remaining operations to the airport in 2018. The airport offers a recently expanded parking facility with the area's lowest parking cost. The airport's master plan calls for an expanded terminal to add another three gates, should air service spike at any time.

Statistics

Passenger traffic

Ground transportation
Youngstown Airport has a number of taxicab and shuttle services.

The only rental car company actively operating out of the location are Avis_Car_Rental and Budget_Rent_a_Car.

See also
Lansdowne Airport
Salem Airpark
Youngstown Elser Metro Airport
Youngstown Executive Airport

References

External links
 Youngstown Warren Regional Airport, official site
 
 

County airports in Ohio
Transportation in Youngstown, Ohio
Works Progress Administration in Ohio
Buildings and structures in Trumbull County, Ohio
Transportation in Trumbull County, Ohio
Warren, Ohio